Diphosphoinositol polyphosphate phosphohydrolase 1 is an enzyme that in humans is encoded by the NUDT3 gene.

NUDT3 belongs to the MutT, or Nudix, protein family. Nudix proteins act as homeostatic checkpoints at important stages in nucleoside phosphate metabolic pathways, guarding against elevated levels of potentially dangerous intermediates, like 8-oxo-dGTP, which promotes AT-to-CG transversions (Safrany et al., 1998).[supplied by OMIM]

References

Further reading

Nudix hydrolases